Brian Lara is a former cricketer and captain of the West Indies cricket team. He was a skilled batsman, and was known for his ability to bat for long and high-scoring innings. From his debut in international cricket in 1990 to his retirement in 2007, Lara scored 11,953 runs in Tests and 10,405 in One Day Internationals (ODI), accumulating a total of 53 centuries. His accomplishments with the bat saw him chosen as the BBC Overseas Sports Personality of the Year in 1994, as well as one of the Wisden Cricketers of the Year in 1995.

 Lara scored a Test century for the first time in his fifth Test match in 1993 against Australia. His score of 277 in that match is the fourth-highest maiden century in Test history. The 375 he made against England in 1994 was the highest individual Test score for nine years, until Matthew Hayden surpassed it in 2003. Lara regained the world record in 2004 when he made an unbeaten 400, once again against England. It is also the only quadruple century in Test cricket. The unbeaten 153 he scored against Australia in 1999 was rated as the second-best Test innings of all time by the Wisden Cricketers' Almanack in 2001. He has scored more than 200 runs on nine occasions, the highest after Donald Bradman. Alongside Sir Donald Bradman, Virender Sehwag and Chris Gayle, he is one of four batsmen who have scored triple centuries on two occasions. Lara scored 34 centuries during his Test career, the highest number by a West Indian player. He is ranked sixth for the highest number of centuries in a career along with Mahela Jayawardene, Sunil Gavaskar and Younis Khan, behind Sachin Tendulkar, Jacques Kallis, Ricky Ponting, Kumar Sangakkara and Rahul Dravid.

Lara's first ODI century came more than two years after his debut match, when he scored 128 against Pakistan. His career best is 169 runs made against Sri Lanka in 1995. It is also the third highest individual score by a West Indian batsman. The 117 he made against Bangladesh in 1999 is the fifth fastest century in ODI cricket. It was made in 45 balls at a strike rate of 188.70, reaching the boundary on eighteen occasions and clearing it on four. During his career, he scored more than 150 runs on three occasions. By the time of his retirement, he had scored 19 centuries in ODI matches. This is the second highest number of centuries scored by a single batsman for the West Indies, a record that Chris Gayle surpassed.

Key 
 *  Remained not out
   Captain in that match
   Man of the match
 (D/L)  Result was determined by the Duckworth–Lewis method

Test cricket centuries

ODI centuries

References

External links
Player profile of Lara at Cricinfo

Lara
Brian Lara
Lara, Brian